The 2021 season was the Tampa Bay Buccaneers' 46th season in the National Football League (NFL) and their third and final season under head coach Bruce Arians. They entered the season as defending Super Bowl champions and were attempting to become the first club to win consecutive Super Bowls since the team's quarterback Tom Brady did so with New England in XXXVIII and XXXIX. They entered the season riding a franchise record eight consecutive wins (including regular season and playoffs), which they extended to ten wins until they lost against the Rams. After their Week 16 win over Carolina, the Buccaneers clinched the NFC South division for the first time since 2007. Tampa Bay won a franchise record 13 games in the regular season. In Week 18, they secured the #2 seed in the NFC playoffs, then defeated the Philadelphia Eagles 31–15 in the Wild Card Round, notching postseason wins in consecutive seasons for the first time. However, their title defense came to an end with a 30–27 last-second loss to the eventual Super Bowl champion Los Angeles Rams in the Divisional Round.

The Buccaneers became the first team in the NFL's salary cap era to have all 22 starters from their Super Bowl championship team re-signed or under contract for the upcoming season. During the regular season, quarterback Tom Brady in addition to extending several ongoing records, set new individual NFL records for most career starts, most career passing yards, most career pass completions, and became the first player to achieve 600 career touchdown passes. A rash of injuries, however, put several starters on injured reserve, including Chris Godwin and Richard Sherman. In addition, key weapons Rob Gronkowski, Ronald Jones, Leonard Fournette, Lavonte David, and Tristan Wirfs and others, all missed playing time dealing with various injuries. Then in Week 17, Antonio Brown abruptly quit the team mid-game in a high-publicized incident.

Following the season on February 1, 2022, quarterback Tom Brady announced his retirement from the league. Brady had one season remaining on his contract with the Buccaneers. However, on March 13, he retracted his retirement plans, and announced he would return in 2022. Head coach Bruce Arians would also announce his retirement following the season and shifted to a Senior Football Consultant. It was also the 2nd with Rob Gronkowski on the roster as well as his 11th and final season of his NFL career, as he would announce his retirement for a second time on June 21, 2022 via an Instagram post.

Offseason

Free agents

Signings

Draft

Notes
 The Buccaneers were awarded a compensatory selection in the sixth round (217th overall).
 The Buccaneers traded a sixth-round selection (216th overall) to Pittsburgh for offensive tackle Jerald Hawkins and a seventh-round selection (251st overall).
 The Buccaneers traded their fourth-round (137th overall) and sixth-round (compensatory/217th overall) selections to Seattle for a fourth-round selection (129th overall)

Staff

Final roster

<noinclude>

Preseason
Tampa Bay's preseason schedule was announced on May 12. With the expansion of the regular season, the preseason was reduced from four to three games.

Regular season

Schedule
The Buccaneers' 2021 schedule was announced on May 12. As defending Super Bowl champions, the Buccaneers hosted the 2021 NFL Kickoff Game at Raymond James Stadium against the Dallas Cowboys.

Note: Intra-division opponents are in bold text.

Game summaries

Week 1: vs. Dallas Cowboys
NFL Kickoff Game

Tampa Bay hosted Dallas in the Thursday night Kickoff Game. The Buccaneers overcame four turnovers to defeat the Cowboys 31–29. Quarterback Tom Brady threw for 379 yards and four touchdown passes in his NFL record 300th career regular season start. During pregame ceremonies, the Buccaneers unveiled new stadium decorations celebrating their victories in Super Bowl XXXVII and Super Bowl LV.

Tampa Bay received the opening kickoff, but went three-and-out to start the game. Bradley Pinion executed a coffin corner punt, pinning the Cowboys back at their own 2-yard line. Tampa Bay got the ball back after a Dallas punt. Tom Brady connected with passes to Mike Evans, Rob Gronkowski and Antonio Brown, and capped off the drive with a 5-yard touchdown pass to Chris Godwin for a 7–0 early lead.

Tampa Bay broke a 7–7 tie with a 2-yard touchdown pass from Brady to Gronkowski. The drive was set up after a long punt return by Jaydon Mickens. Dallas trimmed the score to 14–13 after a touchdown from Dak Prescott to Amari Cooper. Tom Brady's first interception of the night led to a Cowboys field goal. But on their next drive, Brady connected with a wide open Antonio Brown for a 47-yard touchdown, and a 21–16 halftime lead.

The Cowboys opened up the second half with a lengthy field goal drive, to make the score 21–19. Carlton Davis intercepted Dak Prescott, which set up Gronkowski's second touchdown catch. But the Cowboys responded with a 10-play, 75-yard drive, culminating in a 21-yard touchdown catch by Amari Cooper, his second of the day as well.

Tampa Bay clung to a 28–26 lead entering the fourth quarter. With 5:04 left, the Buccaneers were driving at the Dallas 13 yard line. Brady's short pass to Chris Godwin was caught but subsequently fumbled at the 2 yard line and recovered by the Cowboys. The Cowboys drove down the field for a 48-yard go-ahead field goal by Greg Zuerlein. With only one timeout left, trailing 29–28 with 1:24 remaining in regulation, Brady drove the Buccaneers 57 yards in eleven plays, down to the Cowboys 18 yard line. Ryan Succop kicked a game-winning 36-yard field goal with 7 seconds left. The Buccaneers extended their franchise-record winning streak (including postseason) to 9 games.

Two of Brady's touchdown passes were to Rob Gronkowski, bringing the duo's career total to 100 touchdown connections in the regular season and playoffs combined.

Week 2: vs. Atlanta Falcons

Quarterback Tom Brady threw for 276 yards and 5 touchdown passes (tying a franchise best) as Tampa Bay defeated Atlanta 48–25. The Buccaneers extended their franchise record winning streak to ten games, and became the first NFL team to score 30+ points in a victorious performance in nine consecutive games.

The Buccaneers won the coin toss and elected to receive. With potential rain in the forecast for the second half, coach Bruce Arians indicated he wanted the offense to hit the field first. Tampa Bay built a 14–0 lead in the first half after two touchdown passes to Rob Gronkowski. A touchdown pass to Mike Evans late in the second quarter set Tampa Bay up for a 21–10 lead.

Atlanta received the kickoff for the second half. On the second play of the third quarter, Matt Ryan was intercepted by Shaquil Barrett, setting the Buccaneers up at the Atlanta 18 yard line. Five plays later, Evans caught his second touchdown pass, and Tampa Bay pulled out to a 28–10 lead. Atlanta rallied, scoring two touchdowns and trimmed the deficit to 28–25 by the end of the third quarter.

Tampa Bay pinned the Falcons back at their own 4 yard line. The defense forced a three-and-out, and the resulting punt gave the Buccaneers excellent field position. Brady threw three straight passes, and Chris Godwin's touchdown grab put the Buccaneers up 35–25 with 9 minutes left in regulation. The Buccaneers defense sealed the game as Mike Edwards twice picked off Matt Ryan and returned both interceptions for touchdowns.

Week 3: at Los Angeles Rams

Tampa Bay snapped a ten-game winning streak, losing their first game of the 2021 season at the Los Angeles Rams. Quarterback Tom Brady, in his first ever game in the city of Los Angeles, threw for 432 yards, one touchdown pass, and ran for a touchdown, but the Buccaneers defense could not contain Matthew Stafford and the high-powered Rams offense. Despite the loss, Brady became the second player in NFL history to pass for over 80,000 career yards.

After a scoreless first quarter, the Rams led 14–7 late in the first half. Tampa Bay drove into Rams territory, but had to settle for a field goal attempt. Ryan Succop's 55-yard attempt sailed wide right, and the Rams led at halftime 14–7. The Buccaneers rushing offense was ineffective in the first half, producing only 18 yards on 9 carries. 

The Rams put the game out of reach in the second half. They scored on four straight drives to build a 34–17 lead. Brady's second touchdown pass trimmed the deficit to 34–24 with just over one minute left in regulation. The ensuing onside kick attempt failed, and the Rams held on for the win.

Week 4: at New England Patriots

Tampa Bay faced New England on Sunday Night Football in a game dubbed "The Return" by NBC Sports. The game marked Tom Brady's first game at Gillette Stadium since leaving the Patriots as a free agent after the 2019 season. Brady passed Drew Brees as the league's all-time career passing yardage leader, and Tampa Bay pulled off a come-from-behind victory to improve to 3–1 on the season. On a rainy night, Brady was warmly welcomed by the Patriots fanbase, but quickly their attention turned to rookie quarterback Mac Jones. Jones would throw for 275 yards and two touchdown passes, and nearly led the Patriots to an upset victory. In a back and forth game, turnovers, the lack of a rushing attack, and ultimately a missed field goal, cost New England a chance to win.

The Buccaneers offense was average in the first half, outgaining the Patriots 227 yards to 129, but managed only six points. With Rob Gronkowski inactive due to a rib injury suffered the previous week, Tampa Bay struggled in the red zone. Ryan Succop gave Tampa Bay an early 3–0 lead, but missed another field goal attempt to start the second quarter. Jones then led the Patriots on a 11-play, 74-yard drive for the game's first touchdown. After trading punts, Brady drove the Buccaneers to the New England 26 yard line just before halftime. Dropped passes due to the wet conditions stalled the drive. Succop kicked a 44-yard field goal with 18 seconds left to make the score 7–6 at halftime.

Tampa Bay received the second half kickoff, but went three-and-out. The Patriots took over near midfield, but three plays into the drive, J. J. Taylor fumbled at the Tampa Bay 28 yard line, and it was recovered by the Buccaneers. Though they failed to score any points, they were able to punt and pin New England deep in their own territory. On the ensuring drive, with excellent field position, Tampa Bay took the lead with a 8-yard touchdown run by Ronald Jones.

Mac Jones drove the Patriots down the field swiftly, eventually achieving 19 consecutive pass completions, and the Patriots re-took the lead 14–13. Jones threw a 1-yard touchdown pass to Jonnu Smith on the first play of the fourth quarter. With Leonard Fournette and Ronald Jones the leading rushers on the night, Tampa Bay's more balanced offense again drove into the red zone, but had to again settle for a field goal. With under 8 minutes left in regulation, Tampa Bay led 16–14.

Jakobi Meyers caught a 21-yard reception, then executed a Flea flicker pass to Nelson Agholor, setting the Patriots up at the Tampa Bay 8 yard line. The Buccaneers defense stiffened, and the Patriots had to settle for a field goal, and a 17–16 lead. Tampa Bay took over with 4:34 remaining in regulation. A costly Pass interference penalty on the Patriots advanced Tampa Bay to the New England 44 yard line. The drive stalled at the 30 yard line, and Succop kicked the go-ahead field goal as the game hit the Two-minute warning.

Trailing 19–17, Mac Jones drove the Patriots into Tampa Bay territory, aided by a Pass Interference call on Jordan Whitehead. With heavy rain now falling, New England faced a 3rd & 3 at the Tampa Bay 37. Jones' pass was batted down at the line of scrimmage by Lavonte David, bringing up fourth down. With 59 seconds left in regulation, in a driving rain, Nick Folk's 56-yard field attempt hit the left upright and fell no good. Tampa Bay ran out the clock, and beat the Patriots for the first time since 2000.

Week 5: vs. Miami Dolphins

Quarterback Tom Brady threw for 411 yards and five touchdown passes, as Tampa Bay defeated in-state rival Miami 45–17. Antonio Brown was the standout receiver, with two touchdown receptions, and 124 total yards. Midway through the second quarter, Brown caught a short, 8-yard pass from Brady, then broke free untouched for a 62-yard touchdown. It was the longest play of the game, and the longest play of the Buccaneers' season thus far.

Just before halftime, Miami drove to the Tampa Bay 30 yard line, but Jacoby Brissett was sacked and fumbled, snuffing out the drive. Brissett was already hobbling with a hamstring injury suffered in the first quarter. Bradley Pinion attempted a 60-yard field as time expired, but missed wide left. Tampa Bay led 24–10 at halftime.

The Dolphins trimmed the deficit to seven points, making the score 24–17 late in the third quarter. But Tampa Bay dominated the fourth quarter. Brady connected with Mike Evans for two touchdowns, as the Buccaneers pulled away for a 45–17 victory, and improved to 4–1 on the season, their best start since 2005. It was the most points Tampa Bay ever scored against their in-state rival Miami, and their largest margin of victory in the series history. Tom Brady also recorded his first game with 400+ yards passing and five or more touchdown passes in the same game.

Week 6: at Philadelphia Eagles

Tampa Bay traveled to Philadelphia for a Thursday night matchup. The Buccaneers defeated the Eagles 28–22 to improve to 5–1 on the season. Leonard Fournette carried the ball 22 times for 81 yards and two touchdowns, and quarterback Tom Brady threw two touchdown passes. The Buccaneers built a 21-point lead, then held off an Eagles rally for a 6-point victory.

The Buccaneers defense held Jalen Hurts to only 20 yards passing in the first half. The Eagles offense in total was held to under 100 scrimmage yards through three quarters. However, two costly defensive Pass interference penalties against Tampa Bay paved the way for two Eagles touchdowns. 

With 9:04 left in regulation, the Tampa Bay offense elected to go for it on a 4th & 2 at the Philadelphia 46 yard line. Brady's pass was incomplete intended for O. J. Howard, turning the ball over on downs. The Eagles took advantage of the field position driving for a touchdown, and trimmed the score to 28–22 with six minutes left in regulation. The Buccaneers, however, were able to control the ball for the rest of the game. Twice they converted on third down and managed to run the clock out to secure the victory.

Tampa Bay's 5–1 start matches the franchise's best record after six games (1979, 1997, 2002, 2005). Tampa Bay and Philadelphia would later meet in the Wild Card playoffs, with the Buccaneers victorious again.

Week 7: vs. Chicago Bears

Quarterback Tom Brady became the first player in NFL history to throw 600 career touchdown passes (regular season). Brady reached the historic career milestone with a 9-yard touchdown pass to Mike Evans late in the first quarter. The Buccaneers routed the Bears by the score of 38–3. Brady threw a total of four touchdown passes, three to Evans, as Tampa Bay took an unsurmountable 35–3 lead into halftime.

Despite missing Lavonte David and Richard Sherman, the Tampa Bay defense still dominated the Bears. Quarterback Justin Fields was sacked four times, lost two fumbles, and was intercepted three times. The Buccaneers improved to 6–1 on the season, and 4–0 at home. It is the team's first 6–1 start in franchise history.

Week 8: at New Orleans Saints

Quarterback Tom Brady threw four touchdown passes, but lost a fumble and threw two interceptions (one of which was returned for a touchdown), as Tampa Bay fell to division rival New Orleans. It was the fourth consecutive regular season victory by the Saints in the rivalry, although Tampa Bay had won the previous meeting, which was during the 2020 season playoffs.

Tampa Bay faced former quarterback Jameis Winston for the first time since Winston was named the starting quarterback for the Saints. Winston departed Tampa following the 2019 season. Early in the second quarter, at the Saints own 9 yard line, Winston scrambled for 3 yards, but was taken down by Devin White's Horse-collar tackle. Winston suffered a torn ACL and damaged MCL, and was replaced by back up quarterback Trevor Siemian for the remainder of the game. Penalties by the Buccaneers (11 for 99 yards) were the story of the day. One interception in the endzone was negated by penalty, and multiple Saints drives were extended by penalties on the Tampa Bay defense.

Brady rallied the Buccaneers from a 23–7 deficit. Tampa Bay took a 27–26 lead with a 50-yard touchdown pass from Brady to Cyril Grayson. The Saints then added a go-ahead field goal with 1:41 left in regulation. Trailing 29–27, Brady's pick-six with 1:36 left secured the win for New Orleans.

The amount of penalties committed by Tampa Bay almost surpassed the 2015 Philadelphia Eagles as they were hit with 10 penalties six years ago.

Week 10: at Washington Football Team

This was a rematch of the 2020 Wild Card Round in which Tampa Bay defeated Washington 31–23 on their way to a Super Bowl victory. The Washington Football Team ended up the better team this game, as the defending champions were given a 29–19 upset loss.

Two first quarter interceptions thrown by Tom Brady led to field goals; Washington's lead increased to 13 points with a DeAndre Carter pass from Washington quarterback Taylor Heinicke. The Buccaneers were able to close the lead to 16–13, and then to 23–19 after a 40-yard touchdown pass to Mike Evans with 10:55 remaining in regulation. But a 19-play, 80-yard touchdown drive lasting over ten minutes by Washington effectively closed the fourth quarter sealing Tampa Bay's fate as Washington won 29–19.

Week 11: vs. New York Giants

Tampa Bay hosted the Giants on Monday Night Football. The Buccaneers snapped a two-game losing streak and won by the score of 30–10. With a touchdown reception in the third quarter, Mike Evans became the franchise's all-time leader in total touchdowns with 72. He came into the game tied with Mike Alstott (71), who had held that distinction since 2001.

The Buccaneers set the tone for the night early, taking the opening kickoff, and driving 73 yards in eight plays (never facing a third down). Tom Brady connected to Chris Godwin for a 13-yard touchdown pass, and a 7–0 early score. The Buccaneers defense then forced a turnover on downs. Both teams traded field goals, and the score was 10–3 in favor of the Buccaneers. On a 1st & 10 at their own 15 yard line, Brady's short pass attempt to Evans was bobbled and intercepted by Adoree' Jackson, who was tackled at the Tampa Bay 5 yard line. Two plays later, Daniel Jones lofted a pass to linebacker Andrew Thomas for a 2-yard touchdown, and a 10–10 tie.

Trailing 17–10, the Giants received the second half kickoff. Once again, the Giants offense turned the ball over on downs in Tampa Bay territory. After Evans' record-setting touchdown, the Buccaneers were up 24–10. Ryan Succop tacked on two more field goals, and the Buccaneers cruised to a 30–10 victory.

Tom Brady threw for 307 yards and two touchdown passes. After missing several weeks recuperating from injury, Rob Gronkowski returned to the lineup, making 8 catches for 71 yards. The Buccaneers defense held Jones to only 167 yards passing, two interceptions, and two sacks. The Giants were held scoreless in the second half, and outside of the first drive of the third quarter, had only four plays in Tampa Bay territory in the second half.

Week 12: at Indianapolis Colts

Leonard Fournette had 17 rushes for 100 yards and three touchdowns, along with one receiving touchdown, as Tampa Bay defeated Indianapolis by the score of 38–31. The Buccaneers erased a ten-point halftime deficit, scoring 17 points off of turnovers in the second half. Fournette reportedly gave an impassioned halftime speech in the locker room to help motivate his teammates.

The Buccaneers took a 7–3 lead early in the second quarter with a 1-yard touchdown run by Leonard Fournette, his first of the game. The touchdown drive was set up by a Colts fumble. Indianapolis, however, jumped ahead with a 62-yard bomb from Carson Wentz to Ashton Dulin. Three plays later, Tom Brady's deep pass intended for Scotty Miller was intercepted by Isaiah Rodgers at the Indianapolis 10 yard line. Wentz drove the Colts 90 yards in 9 plays, capped off by a 15-yard touchdown pass to Jack Doyle. The Buccaneers answered with a touchdown catch by Fournette, but the Colts were not done. Inside the two-minute warning, Wentz and the Colts swiftly moved down the field, twice converting on 3rd-and-long. Facing a 4th & 1 at the Tampa Bay 4, head coach Frank Reich elected to go for it, and T. Y. Hilton made the catch for a touchdown. The Colts took a 24–14 lead into halftime.

The Colts received the ball to start the second half, but the third quarter would belong to the Buccaneers. Driving at the Tampa Bay 20 yard line, Wentz was sacked by Shaquil Barrett and fumbled. Brady's second deep pass attempt to Scotty Miller was incomplete, but this time drew a pass interference penalty. Three plays later, Fournette scored his second rushing touchdown. The Colts crossed midfield, and Wentz threw a deep bomb to Michael Pittman Jr., but this time he was intercepted by Antoine Winfield Jr. The Buccaneers would turn that turnover into points as well. After a key 32-yard reception by Rob Gronkowski, and a pass interference penalty in the endzone, Ronald Jones II scored on a 1-yard carry. 

The Buccaneers defense forced a three-and-out to start the fourth quarter. Tampa Bay received the ball, but also went three-and-out, still clinging to a 28–24 lead. Bradley Pinion's punt was muffed by Nyheim Hines, and recovered by Scotty Miller at the Colts 19 yard line. Ryan Succop kicked a 25-yard field goal to put Tampa Bay up 31–24 with 10:06 left in regulation. 

After giving up 17 straight points off of turnovers, the Colts shifted their offensive attack to running back Jonathan Taylor. Taylor handled eight carries on their next drive, including a 4-yard touchdown run that tied the game at 31–31. With 3:29 left, the Buccaneers drove for the winning touchdown. Tom Brady completed four passes, and two strong runs by Leonard Fournette, set the Buccaneers up with a 1st & 10 at the Colts 28 yard line with 29 seconds left. Tampa Bay was expected to run the clock down and kick a field goal. Fournette took a handoff, but shockingly broke free and made it to the endzone for a 28-yard touchdown run, his fourth score of the day. Leading 38–31, the Buccaneers almost gave up a touchdown on the ensuing kickoff return. Isaiah Rodgers ran the ball back 72 yards to the Tampa Bay 32 yard line before Mike Edwards remarkably chased him down. After a quick incompletion, Carson Wentz's Hail Mary pass fell short of the endzone and was intercepted by Pierre Desir as time expired.

Week 13: at Atlanta Falcons

Tampa Bay swept the Atlanta Falcons for the second season in a row, after a 30–17 victory at Mercedes-Benz Stadium. Chris Godwin set a franchise single-game record with 15 pass receptions, while Tom Brady threw for 368 yards in 51 attempts and four touchdowns. The Buccaneers defense sacked Matt Ryan five times, and the Falcons committed five fumbles (1 lost). 

Despite the Falcons entering the game ranked only 23rd in the league in rushing defense, the Tampa Bay offense came out of the gate with a passing attack. On the opening drive, the Buccaneers drove 75 yards in 13 plays - all passing plays. Tom Brady capped the drive off with a 3-yard touchdown pass to the previous week's offensive standout Leonard Fournette. On their next drive, Brady completed key passes to Chris Godwin (25 yards), then with Mike Evans (36 yards), setting up a 3-yard touchdown pass to Cameron Brate. 

Brady connected with Rob Gronkowski for a 27-yard touchdown catch, and a 20–10 lead mid-way through the second quarter. With under five minutes left in the half, Matt Ryan drove the Falcons across midfield. The drive stalled at the Tampa Bay 42, and Thomas Morstead's punt pinned the Buccaneers back to their own 7 yard line. With 27 seconds left in the half, Brady from his own endzone, threw a short pass left intended for Leonard Fournette. Marlon Davidson undercut the route and intercepted the ball, running it three yards to the endzone for a surprising Falcons touchdown. The Buccaneers took a 20–17 into halftime. 

The Falcons got the ball to start the second half. Four plays into the drive, Ryan's pass to Russell Gage was caught at the Tampa Bay 45, but punched out by Pierre Desir and the fumble was recovered by Carlton Davis. The Falcons would subsequently be held scoreless in the second half. Brady tacked on a second touchdown pass to Gronkowski - the duo's 90th regular season touchdown - which moved them into second all-time in NFL history.

With this victory Tampa Bay recorded a season with a winning record in consecutive years for the first time since they did so in 2007 and 2008.

Week 14: vs. Buffalo Bills

Tampa Bay built a 24–3 halftime lead, then survived a furious Bills comeback to win 33–27 in overtime. Quarterback Tom Brady threw his 700th career touchdown pass (combined regular season & postseason), a game-winning, 58-yard catch and run to Breshad Perriman in overtime. Brady also set the NFL record for most pass completions (passing Drew Brees). The Buccaneers improved to 10–3 on the season, and 6–0 at home. It was the Buccaneers 8th consecutive win at Raymond James Stadium (including Super Bowl LV).

On the first play of the game, an errant snap was fumbled for a 14-yard loss leading to a three-and-out. But Tampa Bay otherwise dominated the first half. Leonard Fournette's 47-yard touchdown run gave the Buccaneers an early 7–0 lead. The teams traded field goals, then at the Buffalo 13 yard line, Brady dropped back under pressure. He threw up a high pass to Mike Evans, who made a leaping fingertip grab in the left corner of the endzone for the touchdown. The Bills failed to advance into Tampa Bay territory on their next drive, and punted back to the Buccaneers. Brady connected again to Evans for a lofting, 20-yard catch at the Buffalo 2 yard line. Two plays later, Brady's 1-yard quarterback sneak put Tampa Bay up 24–3. The Bills had one last chance before halftime, but the drive was snuffed out when Josh Allen's errant pass was intercepted by a diving Richard Sherman.

The Bills mounted a spirited comeback in the second half. Josh Allen had a touchdown run and two touchdown passes to trim the score to 27–24. With 3:05 left in the fourth quarter, the Bills got the ball for a potential game-winning or game-tying score. Allen drove the Bills to the Tampa Bay 7 yard line, but Buccaneers defense kept them out of the endzone. Kicker Tyler Bass's 25-yard field goal tied the game at 27–27 with 25 seconds remaining in regulation. The Bills had outscored the Buccaneers 24–3 in the second half.

In the overtime period, Buffalo won the coin toss and received. The Bills went three-and-out, and were forced to punt. Matt Haack's 63-yard punt pinned the Buccaneers back at their own 6 yard line. Facing a 3rd & 1 at their own 15 yard line, Leonard Fournette rushed up the middle for an apparent first down. The play was reviewed and upheld, giving Tampa Bay a first down. A costly pass interference penalty on Levi Wallace advanced the Buccaneers to the 35 yard line. Two plays later, Brady connected to Rob Gronkowski for a 14-yard gain to the Tampa Bay 42 yard line. Facing 3rd & 3, Brady hit Breshad Perriman on crossing route, and Perriman scurried 58 yards down the right sidelines, nearly untouched, for the game-winning touchdown.

Week 15: vs. New Orleans Saints

Tampa Bay hosted division rival New Orleans on Sunday Night Football. With a win, the Buccaneers would clinch the NFC South division title (the club's first since 2007). The Saints shutout the Buccaneers 9–0, sweeping the regular season series for the third year in a row. It was also the first time Brady was shutout in a game since Week 14 of the 2006 season against the Miami Dolphins. 

Injuries sent several Buccaneers players to the locker room. Mike Evans (strained hamstring), Chris Godwin (torn ACL), Leonard Fournette (hamstring), Lavonte David (foot), and Pat O'Connor (knee) all left the game early. Breshad Perriman was inactive on the COVID-19 list, while Antonio Brown and Mike Edwards were both serving the final game of a three-week suspension due to presenting counterfeit vaccination cards. Quarterback Tom Brady was sacked four times, threw an interception, and fumbled away the ball on a quarterback scramble. Neither team reached the end zone, and Brett Maher's three field goals were the only points of the game.

Prior to the game, Saints head coach Sean Payton tested positive for COVID-19 and was not permitted to attend. With the loss (their first home loss of the season), Tampa Bay slipped to 10–4, and failed to secure a playoff berth for at least one additional week.

After being picked off  by the Saints, Brady yelled at Dennis Allen and then proceeded to destroy the Microsoft Surface Pro tablet in frustration.

Week 16: at Carolina Panthers

Tampa Bay clinched the NFC South division title after a 32–6 victory at rival Carolina. Going into the game, the Buccaneers starting lineup was depleted by injuries and the COVID-19 list. Antonio Brown returned to the lineup after recuperating from an ankle injury, then a three-game suspension. Brown led all receivers with ten catches for 101 yards. The Buccaneers won their division for the first time since 2007, and clinched a playoff berth for the second year in a row - the first time going to the playoffs in consecutive seasons since 1999–2002. 

The Panthers got on the board first, after a 24-yard Lirim Hajrullahu field goal, and took a 3–0 lead. The game turned quickly, however, in the Buccaneers' favor, with big plays on offense. Ke'Shawn Vaughn's 55-yard touchdown run in the first quarter gave the Buccaneers a 7–3 lead, and was their longest rush of the season. Later, Tom Brady found a wide-open Cyril Grayson for a 62-yard catch down the right sideline. That set up a 4-yard touchdown pass to Cameron Brate. 

The Buccaneers took a 19–6 lead into halftime, and shutout the Panthers in the second half. Ronald Jones II added a touchdown run in the third quarter. The Buccaneers defense tallied seven sacks and one interception. Both Sam Darnold and Cam Newton took snaps at quarterback for Carolina.

Week 17: at New York Jets

Cyril Grayson's 33-yard touchdown catch from Tom Brady with 15 seconds left in regulation gave the Buccaneers a 28–24 win over the Jets. Tampa Bay beat the Jets on the road for the first time in franchise history, improved to 12–4 on the season, and both surpassed their regular season win total from the year prior as well as tied the Super Bowl-winning 2002 Tampa Bay Buccaneers for the most wins in a single season in franchise history with 12. Brady threw for 410 yards and three touchdowns, and the Buccaneers overcame a 14-point deficit, their largest comeback win of the season. Brady and Zach Wilson (born 22 years apart to the day) set an NFL mark for the largest age gap between starting quarterbacks.

The Jets won the opening coin toss and elected to receive. Quarterback Zach Wilson drove the Jets 72 yards in 6 plays, capped off by a 1-yard direct snap reverse and a Braxton Berrios touchdown. Tampa Bay answered with a 4-yard touchdown pass to Mike Evans and a 7–7 tie. Frustration on offense plagued the Buccaneers for most of the rest of the first half. With New York leading 14–10, the Jets punted to Tampa Bay with 1:01 left in the second quarter. Tom Brady connected with two straight passes to Rob Gronkowski, advancing to the Jets 46 yard line. Brady's deep pass intended for Mike Evans, however, was intercepted by Brandin Echols. The Jets tacked on a field goal by Eddy Piñeiro, and led 17–10 at halftime.

Tampa Bay received the second half kickoff, but an Unsportsmanlike conduct penalty on Ryan Jensen, helped stall the drive. Ty Johnson's 1-yard touchdown run gave the Jets a 24–10 lead with 6:56 left in the third, their biggest lead of the game. 

The Buccaneers' next possession started out with another costly penalty, this time an Unnecessary roughness on Ali Marpet. Facing a 3rd & 20 at their own 15, Brady completed to Cyril Grayson, who stepped just on the mark to make, and got a first down to keep the drive alive. Breshad Perriman hauled in a 32-yard grab, then Cameron Brate capped off the drive with a 4-yard touchdown pass on a 4th & Goal. The score was now 24–17 with 29 seconds left in the third quarter.

To start the fourth quarter, the Buccaneers defense held the Jets to a three-and-out on their first two drives. The Jets punted from their own endzone, giving the Buccaneers good field position at the New York 47 yard line. Tampa Bay got to the 9 yard line, but Brady's pass attempt went through the hands of Tyler Johnson near the 1-yard line. The Buccaneers settled for a 27-yard Ryan Succop field goal, and trimmed the deficit to 24–20 with 7:36 remaining. 

Zach Wilson drove the Jets down to the Buccaneers 7 yard line. The Jets took over five minutes off the clock, forcing Tampa Bay to use up their timeouts on defense. Facing a 4th & 2 at the Tampa Bay 7, the Jets decided to forego a chip-shot field goal attempt. Wilson attempted a quarterback keeper, but was stuffed for no gain. The Jets turned the ball over on downs. Tampa Bay took over at their 7 yard line with 2:12 left, and no timeouts. Brady made quick completions to Tyler Johnson and Cyril Grayson, moving all the way the Jets 33. Then with 15 seconds left in regulation, Brady found Grayson at the goal line for a 33-yard game-winning touchdown.

At the 3:00 mark of the third quarter, wide receiver Antonio Brown removed his uniform and pads, and left the field. Brown ran down through the endzone, waving to fans, went through the tunnel to the locker room and did not return. Shortly after the game, head coach Bruce Arians announced Brown was "no longer a Buc". The Buccaneers officially terminated Brown's contract four days after the game, on January 6, 2022.

Week 18: vs. Carolina Panthers

Tampa Bay swept division rival Carolina, and secured the #2 seed in the NFC playoffs, winning their single-season franchise record 13th regular season game. Quarterback Tom Brady threw for 326 yards and three touchdown passes in the victory. Brady topped 5,000 passing yards on the season, the third time that has been achieved in NFL history, also a single-season franchise record. Mike Evans caught 6 passes for 89 yards, becoming the first player in NFL history with 1,000+ receiving yards in each of his first eight seasons. Once again, several key Buccaneers starters were out due to injury, some resting in hopes of returning for the playoffs.

Tampa Bay got off to a slow start, as Carolina dominated the first quarter. The Panthers opened the game with a nearly 8-minute, 14-play touchdown drive. Sam Darnold's 2-yard touchdown pass to Chuba Hubbard gave Carolina an early 7–0 lead. The Buccaneers went three-and-out on their first possession, holding the ball for less than two minutes. Carolina drove to the Tampa Bay 39, but failed on a 4th & 6, turning the ball over on downs to end the first quarter.

Tampa Bay got on the board with a 39-yard Ryan Succop field goal. The drive was kept alive with a 14-yard catch by Mike Evans on a 4th & 2 at the Carolina 39. On the subsequent drive, Darnold drove the Panthers to the red zone once again. Facing a 4th & 1 at the 2 yard line, Darnold's quarterback sneak was stuffed for no gain, and the Panthers again turned the ball over on downs. Later in the quarter, inside the two minute warning, Brady swiftly drove the Buccaneers 92 yards in 8 plays. Tampa Bay took a 10–7 lead after Brady's 1-yard touchdown pass to Le'Veon Bell. 

The Buccaneers routed the Panthers in the second half. Ke'Shawn Vaughn scored on a 2-yard touchdown run to open the third quarter, and Mike Evans had two touchdown catches in the fourth quarter. With Tampa Bay leading 31–17 with 6:38 to go, Sam Darnold's quarterback scramble saw him fumble the ball away, the game's first turnover. Tampa Bay added a field goal for a 34–17 margin. The Panthers went four-and-out giving the ball right back to the Buccaneers at the 33 yard line. In one play, Scotty Miller took a reverse, and turned it up field for a 33-yard touchdown run, to stretch the lead to 41–17. On the next play from scrimmage, Andrew Adams intercepted Darnold, the game's second turnover. Tampa Bay failed to score any additional points, but held on for a 41–17 victory. 

Minutes after Tampa Bay's game concluded, the Rams lost to the 49ers in overtime, effectively placing the Buccaneers in the #2 seed in the NFC playoff field.

Standings

Division

Conference

Postseason

Game summaries

NFC Wild Card Playoffs: vs. (7) Philadelphia Eagles

Tampa Bay ran up 31 unanswered points on the way to their fifth consecutive postseason win over the last two seasons. For 44-year-old Bucs quarterback Tom Brady, it was his 35th career playoff win.

The Buccaneers started out the game with a 12-play, 75-yard drive to go up 7–0 on Giovani Bernard's 2-yard touchdown run. After the next three possessions ended in punts, Brady completed 5 of 6 passes for 62 yards on a 70-yard drive that ended with Ke'Shawn Vaughn's 1-yard score, putting the Bucs ahead 14–0 with 25 seconds left in the first quarter. The Eagles had to punt again, and Tampa Bay drove back for more points, this time moving the ball 53 yards in 11 plays to take a 17–0 lead with Ryan Succop's 34-yard field goal.

Philadelphia responded with their most promising drive of the day, moving the ball to the Buccaneers 37-yard line, only to lose the ball with incomplete pass on 4th and 5. Then after a punt, they drove to the Tampa Bay's 27. But once again they failed to score as defensive back Mike Edwards intercepted Jalen Hurts' pass in the end zone.

Both teams punted on their first possession of the second half, but on the Buccaneers punt, Jalen Reagor muffed the kick and Ross Cockrell recovered the ball for Tampa Bay on the Eagles 48-yard line. Brady started off the next drive with a screen pass to Bernard that picked up 21 yards, and eventually finished it with a 2-yard touchdown toss to tight end Rob Gronkowski, increasing the lead to 24–0. Then linebacker Shaq Barrett intercepted a pass from Hurts and returned it 17 yards to the Eagles 36-yard line, where Brady gave the Bucs a 31–0 lead with a touchdown pass to Mike Evans on the next play.

Philadelphia finally managed to get on the board early in the fourth quarter after Reagor returned a punt 31 yards to the Eagles 35-yard line. Hurts completed a 31-yard pass to DeVonta Smith on the next play, and then Boston Scott scored on a 34-yard touchdown run. Then after a punt, Hurts completed 7 of 9 passes for 81 yards and rushed for 6 on a 93-yard drive that ended with his 16-yard touchdown pass to running back Kenneth Gainwell. Hurts then completed a pass to Smith for a two-point conversion to make the score 31–15, but any chance of a comeback was snuffed out when the Bucs recovered Philadelphia's onside kick attempt.

Brady completed 29 of 37 passes for 271 yards and two touchdowns. Evans caught 9 passes for 117 yards and a score. Bernard rushed for 44 yards and a touchdown, while also catching 5 passes for 39 yards. Hurts finished the game 23/43 for 258 yards and a touchdown, with 2 interceptions, along with 8 carries for 39 yards. Tight end Dallas Goedert was his top target with 6 catches for 92 yards.

NFC Divisional Playoffs: vs. (4) Los Angeles Rams

The Buccaneers' hopes of a second consecutive Super Bowl appearance came to an end at the hands of the fourth-seeded Los Angeles Rams, who upset the defending champions on a last-second 30-yard field goal by kicker Matt Gay. Los Angeles built a 27-3 lead, but Tampa Bay rallied to score 24 unanswered points and tied the game with 42 seconds remaining in regulation. The Rams swept the Buccaneers, having also defeated them during the regular season, and ultimately advanced to Super Bowl LVI.

Gay converted field goals of 26 and 40 yards in the first and second quarters, respectively, while quarterback Matthew Stafford threw touchdown passes of 7 yards to tight end Kendall Blanton and 70 yards to wide receiver Cooper Kupp to put the Rams ahead late in the first half. Late in the second quarter, cornerback Nick Scott intercepted a pass by Tom Brady, setting up the Rams deep in Tampa Bay territory. However, running back Cam Akers, making his first start of the season, was stripped of the ball at the Tampa Bay 1 yard line with 24 seconds left to leave the score 20–3 at halftime.

Stafford added a 1-yard touchdown sneak to put the Rams up 27–3 midway through the third quarter, their largest lead of the day. Trailing by 24, the Buccaneers scored on a Ryan Succop field goal with 3:06 left in the third quarter. On the first play of the next possession, Cooper Kupp fumbled away the ball, and it was recovered by Tampa Bay. This led to a 1-yard touchdown run by Leonard Fournette, and the score was now 27–13 at the end of the third quarter.

The Rams squandered opportunities to put the game away, going three-and-out to start the fourth quarter. On the next possession, linebacker Von Miller's strip sack of Brady gave Los Angeles the ball Tampa Bay 25. But they gave the ball right back to the Buccaneers with an errant shotgun snap on the next play from scrimmage. Later in the fourth quarter, the Rams missed another scoring opportunity as Gay came up short on a 45-yard field goal attempt with 6:36 remaining.

Following another exchange of punts, Brady threw a 55-yard touchdown pass to wide receiver Mike Evans to trim the score to 27–20 with 3:27 left in regulation. The Buccaneers were out of timeouts, and elected not to attempt an onside kick, and kicked off to the Rams. On the second play of the drive, Akers fumbled for the second time during the game, giving Tampa Bay the ball at the Los Angeles 30 yard line. Seven plays later, facing a 4th & 1 at the 9 yard line - with many expecting a quarterback sneak - Brady instead gave a handoff to Leonard Fournette who broke to the right untouched for a 9-yard touchdown. With 42 seconds  left in regulation, the Buccaneers tied the score at 27–27.

Stafford shrugged off a first down sack and connected with Cooper Kupp for a 20-yard gain to the 44 yard line. Stafford and Kupp hooked up on the very next play for a 44-yard bomb over the middle as Kupp (9 receptions, 183 yards) beat Buccaneers free safety Antoine Winfield Jr. in single coverage all the way down to the Tampa Bay 12. Stafford then spiked the ball with four seconds remaining to set up Gay's winning kick. It was the Buccaneers' third loss in as many postseason meetings with the Rams, the last two occurring in NFC Championship in 1979 and 1999. With the crushing 30–27 loss, Tampa Bay finished with a total combined record of 14–5, including the postseason.

Statistics

Team

Individual

Statistics correct as of the end of the 2021 NFL season

Awards
 NFC Offensive Player of the Week
 Week 5: Tom Brady
 Week 12: Leonard Fournette
 NFC Defensive Player of the Week
 Week 2: Mike Edwards
 NFC Special Teams Player of the Week
 Week 1: Bradley Pinion
 FedEx Air Player of the Week/Year
 Week 1: Tom Brady
 Week 2: Tom Brady
Week 18: Tom Brady
Player of the year: Tom Brady

References

External links
 

Tampa Bay
Tampa Bay Buccaneers seasons
NFC South championship seasons
Tampa Bay Buccaneers